The Donegal Junior Football Championship (abbreviated as Donegal JFC) is an annual football competition organised by Donegal GAA.

Na Dúnaibh are the title holders (2022) defeating Letterkenny Gaels in the Final.

History
The competition has been won by 44 clubs, 23 of which have won it more than once. Castlefinn Robert Emmet's are the most successful club with seven titles to their credit.

Donegal county team manager Declan Bonner brought national attention to the competition when he lined out for his club Na Rossa in 2019, notably making saves while playing as goalkeeper when his team's regular goalkeeper transferred to New York.

Honours
The winning club receives the Dr McCloskey Cup. The winning club is promoted to the Donegal Intermediate Football Championship for the following season.

The Donegal JFC winner qualifies for the Ulster Junior Club Football Championship. It is the only team from County Donegal to qualify for this competition. The Donegal JFC winner may enter the Ulster Junior Club Football Championship at either the preliminary round or the quarter-final stage. It often does well there, with the likes of Naomh Colmcille and Red Hugh's among the clubs from Donegal to win at least one Ulster Championship after winning the Donegal Junior Football Championship.

The Donegal JFC winner — by winning the Ulster Junior Club Football Championship — may qualify for the All-Ireland Junior Club Football Championship, at which it would enter at the semi-final stage, providing it hasn't been drawn to face the British champions in the quarter-finals.

Winners and finalists

Results by team

Finals listed by year

References

Explanatory notes

Further reading

External links
 Official website of Donegal GAA

Donegal GAA club championships
Junior Gaelic football county championships